Paraíso Tropical (English: Tropical Paradise) is a Brazilian telenovela that was produced and aired by TV Globo from 5 March and 28 September 2007, totaling 179 chapters.

Aired replacing Páginas da Vida, Manoel Carlos, and replaced by Duas Caras of Aguinaldo Silva. The plot was nominated for an International Emmy in 2008 in the new category for best Telenovela.

Featured actress Alessandra Negrini, who played the twins Paula and Taís, Fábio Assunção, Glória Pires, Tony Ramos, Wagner Moura and Camila Pitanga in leading roles.

Plot
Paraíso Tropical is a modern-day urban story that takes place in Rio de Janeiro, where Antenor Cavalcanti has his luxurious hotel company headquarter.

Despite his vast fortune, Antenor is bitter for not having an heir to his empire. The search for a successor provokes the beginning of a clash between two young and talented executives of his group: Daniel Bastos, a lad of simple origins and excellent character, who is not only handsome and charming, but also intelligent and skilled, and Olavo Novaes, an ambitious and unscrupulous man who is ready to fight for the position, at any cost.

To fight against Olavo‘s treacherous plans, Daniel will have the help of the sweet and sensitive Paula, a young lady raised as an only child who discovers, on the eve of her mother‘s death, that she is adopted and has a family.
What Paula does not know is that she has an identical twin sister, the wicked Taís, who is as ambitious and unscrupulous as the man who becomes her main ally, Olavo Novaes. Antenor, for his part, decides to have an heir when he meets the headstrong and honest Lúcia, a woman who will make this cold businessman find true love is and a real reason to live.

Cast

Ratings

References

External links
 

2007 Brazilian television series debuts
2007 Brazilian television series endings
2007 telenovelas
Brazilian LGBT-related television shows
Brazilian telenovelas
Portuguese-language telenovelas
Telenovelas by Gilberto Braga
Television shows set in Rio de Janeiro (city)
TV Globo telenovelas
Television series about twins